Hulshout is a municipality located in the Belgian province of Antwerp. In 2021, Hulshout had a total population of 10,553. The total area is 17.35 km2.

References

External links

Official website - Available only in Dutch

Municipalities of Antwerp Province
Populated places in Antwerp Province